Dr. Joseph Philip Colaco, is an Indian structural engineer and author. Dr. Colaco, known as Joe, is noted for his contributions to the supertall skyscrapers in the United States and in Middle East. He received his PhD. in civil structural engineering from the University of Illinois in 1965.

In 1965, employed by Skidmore, Owings and Merrill, he began working in Chicago, Illinois. In 1969 he joined Ellisor Engineers Inc., Houston, Texas. Dr. Colaco established his own company, CBM Engineers Inc. in 1975 and has been serving as the President of the company.

Dr. Colaco's design innovations improved the construction of high-rise buildings, enabling them to withstand enormous forces generated on these super structures. These new designs opened an economic door for contractors, engineers, architects, and investors, providing vast amounts of real estate space on minimal plots of land.

Dr. Colaco has three sons and seven grandchildren. 

He is noted for his contributions to the designs for some of the multi-billion dollar projects in the United States, Middle East and India including Chicago's 100-story John Hancock Center, 75-story JPMorgan Chase Tower in Houston, 160-story Burj Khalifa Tower in Dubai (present tallest tower in the world) and The Imperial Twin Towers, Tardeo, Mumbai, India. He has also been consulted on the design of a bonfire at Texas A & M University.

Membership
National Academy of Engineering, American Concrete Institute, American Society of Civil Engineers, American Institute of Steel Construction.

Awards
He received the Distinguished Alumni Award in 2002 from the College of Engineering,  University of Illinois at Urbana-Champaign.

Registrations
He is a registered professional engineer in Illinois, Georgia, Texas, Missouri, Colorado, California (Civil) California (Structural Authority), Florida, Michigan, Maryland, Pennsylvania, Virginia, North Carolina, Kentucky, Minnesota, Washington, D.C., United Kingdom and Singapore, Tennessee.

References

External links
Video Interview with Joe Calaco 2014 William R. Jenkins Architecture and Art Library, University of Houston Digital Library.

Indian structural engineers
Grainger College of Engineering alumni
Living people
American civil engineers
20th-century Indian engineers
Year of birth missing (living people)